John Nathan Kildahl (January 4, 1857 – September 25, 1920) was an American Lutheran church minister, author and educator.

Background
Kildahl was born in  Beitstaden parish (Namdalseid), Nord-Trøndelag, Norway. Kildahl emigrated as a boy from Norway to rural Goodhue County, Minnesota. He was educated  at Luther College in Decorah, Iowa. He graduated from Luther Seminary and was ordained by Bernt Julius Muus at St. John's Lutheran Church in Northfield, Minnesota.

Career

Kildahl served as a Lutheran pastor at churches in  Minnesota and Illinois. Kildahl was called first to Lutheran congregations at Vang and Urland in rural Minnesota. He served as principal and professor at Red Wing Seminary. Later Kildahl was President of the Norwegian Evangelical Lutheran Seminary from 1885–86. In 1889, Kildahl was called to Bethlehem Church in Chicago. Kildahl served as the founding pastor of Trinity Norwegian-Danish Lutheran Church from 1891-1892. Trinity Lutheran Church in Evanston, Illinois was organized on July 29, 1891 as a member of the United Norwegian Lutheran Church.

In 1899, Kildahl was elected President of St. Olaf College, a position he would hold until 1914. At St. Olaf College, Kildahl recruited a distinguished faculty that included Ole Rolvaag in the humanities and F. Melius Christiansen in music. He also served as pastor of St. John's Church in Northfield, Minnesota from 1899 to 1903. Starting in 1914, he was a professor at Luther Seminary, St. Paul, Minnesota.

Kildahl was a prolific writer principally regarding matters relating to the Lutheran faith. His original works were written in the Norwegian language. Many of his works were translated into English and published posthumously.

One of the first-year residence halls at St. Olaf College is named after Kildahl.

Selected works
Kirkeraadet har talt ilde(Minneapolis, Augsburg Publishing House. 1904) Norwegian
Naar Jesus Kommer ind i huset (Minneapolis, Augsburg Publishing House. 1906)  Norwegian
Synd og Naade: Praekener over tredje vaekke af kirkeaarets evengelietekster(Minneapolis, Augsburg Publishing House. 1912)  Norwegian
The doctrinal teachings of Christian Science (Minneapolis: Augsburg Publishing House 1920)
Dr. John Nathan Kildahl en Mindebok  (Augsburg Publishing House Minneapolis. 1921)Norwegian
Misconceptions of the word and work of the Holy Spirit (Minneapolis: Augsburg Publishing House. 1927)

References

Additional Sources
Olaf M. Norlie, ed. Norsk Lutherske Menigheter i Amerika, 1843-1916 (Minneapolis: Augsburg Publishing House. 1918) Norwegian
Johan Arnd Aasgaard, ed., Quarter Centennial Souvenir of St. Olaf College, 1874-1899 (Northfield, Mn. 1900)
C. A. Mellby, St. Olaf College through Fifty Years, 1874-1924 (Northfield, Mn. 1925)
Ingebrikt Grose, The Beginnings of St. Olaf College (Studies and Records, 5:110-121. Northfield, Mn. 1930)
 William C. Benson High on Manitou: A history of St. Olaf College, 1874-1949 (St. Olaf College Press. 1949)
Joe Shaw History of St. Olaf College, 1874-1974 (St. Olaf College Press. 1974)
Joe Shaw John Nathan Kildahl (2014)

External links
Kildahl Hall at St. Olaf College

1857 births
1920 deaths
People from Nord-Trøndelag
People from Namsos
Norwegian emigrants to the United States
19th-century American Lutheran clergy
Luther Seminary alumni
Luther College (Iowa) alumni
St. Olaf College faculty
20th-century American Lutheran clergy